The 1999 Regal Scottish Masters was a professional non-ranking snooker tournament that took place between 28 September and 3 October 1999 at the Motherwell Civic Centre in Motherwell, Scotland.

Matthew Stevens won the tournament, defeating John Higgins 9–7 in the final.

Prize Fund
The breakdown of prize money for this year is shown below:
Winner: £61,000
Runner-up: £29,700
Semi-final: £15,350
Quarter-final: £8,650
Round 1: £4,850
Highest break: £5,000
Total: 181,900

Main draw

Qualifying Event
Qualifying for the tournament took place at the Spencer's Snooker Centre in Stirling from 23 to 27 August 1999. Matthew Stevens earned the final spot for the event, beating Marco Fu 5–1 in the final.

Century breaks
 138  Jimmy White
 134  Stephen Hendry
 129  Anthony Hamilton
 128, 126, 111  John Higgins
 106, 100  Chris Small 
 103, 103, 103  Matthew Stevens
 102  Paul Hunter

References

Scottish Masters
1999 in snooker
1999 in Scottish sport